Ramseier is a surname. Notable people with the name include:

Mikhail W. Ramseier (born 1964), Swiss writer
Daniel Ramseier (born 1963), Swiss equestrian
David Ramseier (born 1987), Swiss-French basketball player
Doris Ramseier (born 1939), Swiss equestrian
Peter Ramseier (born 1944), Swiss football player

See also
Ramseier Glacier, is a steep cirque-type glacier, 5 nautical miles (9 km) long, flowing southwest to enter Byrd Glacier immediately east of Mount Rummage
Ramseyer